Taoyuan Senior High School is a railway station on the Taiwan Railways Administration Linkou line located in Taoyuan District, Taoyuan City, Taiwan.

History
The train station was opened on 28 October 2005 and was closed on 28 December 2012.

Nearby stations
Taiwan Railways Administration
  <-- Linkou line -->

See also
 List of railway and metro stations in Taiwan

References

2005 establishments in Taiwan
2012 disestablishments in Taiwan
Defunct railway stations in Taiwan
Railway stations opened in 2005
Railway stations closed in 2012